Albert A. "Luby" DiMeolo (October 27, 1903 – June 17, 1966) was an American football player and coach. He was the second ever head coach for the Pittsburgh Pirates (later renamed the Steelers) of the National Football League. He was born in Youngstown, Ohio, but lived nearly his entire life in Coraopolis, Pennsylvania, just west of Pittsburgh.

DiMeolo was a guard and captain on the 1929 University of Pittsburgh team that was undefeated before losing in the 1930 Rose Bowl to USC. Upon graduating from Pittsburgh, DiMeolo served as offensive line coach at New York University under head coach Chick Meehan and later Howard Cann.

He was passed over for the job in favor of Jap Douds, who lasted just a single season as the team's coach. DiMeolo replaced Douds for the team's second season. He led the Pirates to a disappointing 2–10 record in his first season, after which he was dismissed.

After leaving the Pirates, DiMeolo returned to the college ranks as an assistant coach at Westminster College (Pennsylvania) and later at Carnegie Tech. He joined the navy during World War II and served as a physical instructor, rising to the rank of lieutenant commander.

After leaving the navy, DiMeolo worked in the Pennsylvania state Department of Commerce, before losing his position due to a change in the political party running the government.  He was shortly thereafter named a U.S. Marshal for western Pennsylvania. He served as Marshal until 1961, after which he worked for U.S. Steel.

DiMeolo was married to Amelia Ann Sciliano; the couple had no children. He died at the age of 62 of a heart attack which occurred shortly after he had completed a game of squash in 1966.

References

1903 births
1966 deaths
American football guards
Carnegie Mellon Tartans football coaches
NYU Violets football coaches
Pittsburgh Panthers football players
Pittsburgh Pirates (football) players
Pittsburgh Pirates (football) coaches
Westminster Titans football coaches
United States Marshals
Players of American football from Youngstown, Ohio
Pittsburgh Pirates head coaches